Hebenstretia glaucescens is a species of plant from South Africa. It belongs to the family Scrophulariaceae.

Description 
It has side branches that grow along the ground without rooting and linear or lance-shaped leaves. The margins are not toothed. Flowers are present between July and September. They grow in short, compact spikes. The fruit has a broad oblong shape. The mericarps may be equal or unequal. If unequal, the upper one is deeply concave on the inner face and the lower one has two deep longitudinal grooves on the inner face.

Distribution and habitat 
This species is endemic to the Western Cape of South Africa. It is found at altitudes of 140 – 1370m. It grows on open flats between southern Knersvlakte, southern Bushmanland, Calvinia and Tanqua Karoo.

Conservation 
This species is classified as being of least concern.

References 

Plants described in 1899
Flora of South Africa
Scrophulariaceae